Podbreg is a small settlement above the Tuhinj Valley in the Municipality of Kamnik in the Upper Carniola region of Slovenia.

On a hill above the village stands a church dedicated to Saint Nicholas with wooden Baroque altars, a painted wooden ceiling, and frescoes from the second half of the 18th century. The church used to be fortified against the Ottoman raids and one defense tower is still visible.

References

External links
Podbreg on Geopedia

Populated places in the Municipality of Kamnik